Oskars Ķibermanis (born 4 April 1993) is a Latvian bobsledder. He competed at the FIBT World Championships 2013 in St. Moritz, and at the 2014 Winter Olympics in Sochi, in two-man and four-man bobsleigh.

References

External links

1993 births
Living people
Bobsledders at the 2014 Winter Olympics
Bobsledders at the 2018 Winter Olympics
Bobsledders at the 2022 Winter Olympics
Latvian male bobsledders
Olympic bobsledders of Latvia
People from Valmiera
Bobsledders at the 2012 Winter Youth Olympics